The 2019–20 Argentine Torneo Federal A, was the seventh season of the Torneo Federal A, the regionalised third tier of the Argentine football league system. The tournament is reserved for teams indirectly affiliated to the Asociación del Fútbol Argentino (AFA), while teams affiliated to AFA have to play the Primera B Metropolitana, which is the other third tier competition. The champions are promoted to Primera B Nacional. 30 teams competed in the league, 25 returning from the 2018–19 season, one team that was relegated from Primera B Nacional and four teams promoted from the Torneo Regional Federal Amateur. The regular season began on 1 September 2019 and was expected to end in June 2020.

Due to the COVID-19 pandemic, the Argentine Football Association suspended the tournament on 17 March 2020. On 28 April 2020 AFA announced the abandonment of the competition as well as the culmination of the 2019–20 season in all of its leagues, with no clubs promoted or relegated. AFA also announced that a decision on a suitable method for promotion from Torneo Federal A and the other lower tiers would be reached in due time.

Format

First stage
The teams were divided into two zones with fifteen teams (a total of 30 teams) in each zone and it was played in a round-robin tournament whereby each team played each one of the other teams two times. The top six teams from each zone would qualify for the championship stage.

Championship stage
The teams that qualified from the first stage were divided into the same two zones with six teams each, also called Hexagonal Final, where they would be playing in a round-robin tournament whereby each team played each one of the other teams one time. The winner of each zone would be declared champion and automatically promoted to the Primera B Nacional. Also, the best second place team from the two zones would have qualified for a final match against a team from Primera B Metropolitana for a promotion to Primera B Nacional.

Relegation
After the first stage, the two bottom teams of each zone would be relegated to the Torneo Regional Federal Amateur, giving a total of four teams relegated.

Club information

Zone A

Zone B

First stage

Zone A

Results

Zone B

Results

Season statistics

Top scorers

See also
 2019–20 Argentine Primera División
 2019–20 Primera B Nacional
 2019–20 Copa Argentina

References

External links
 Sitio Oficial de AFA   
 Ascenso del Interior  
 Interior Futbolero 
 Solo Ascenso  
 Mundo Ascenso  
 Promiedos  

Torneo Federal A seasons
3
Torneo Federal A